Score Ridge is a rock ridge 2.5 nautical miles (4.6 km) northwest of Lindstrom Ridge in N-central Meteorite Hills, Darwin Mountains. Named after Roberta Score, manager of the Antarctic Meteorite Laboratory, NASA Johnson Space Center, Houston, TX, 1978–96; member of ANSMET meteorite search teams in several areas of the Transantarctic Mountains, 1984–85 and 1988-89 field seasons; supervisor, Crary Science and Engineering Center (McMurdo), 1996–2001.

Ridges of Oates Land